The Minister for Public Health (Swedish: Folkhälsominister) is a cabinet minister within the Swedish Government. The cabinet minister is appointed by the Prime Minister of Sweden.

List of officeholders 

Government ministers of Sweden
Swedish Ministers for Health
Swedish Ministers for Social Affairs